Richmond is a village in Madison Parish, Louisiana, United States, located on Roundaway Bayou. The population was 577 at the 2010 census. It is part of the Tallulah Micropolitan Statistical Area.

History 

During the American Civil War, Union forces occupied Richmond on March 31, 1863. A Confederate force attempted to repel the invaders but was forced to retreat because of superior federal artillery in the Battle of Richmond.

Geography
Richmond is located at  (32.385935, -91.174639).

Demographics

As of the census of 2000, there were 499 people, 191 households, and 140 families residing in the village. The racial makeup of the village was 92.18% White, 4.81% African American, 0.40% Asian, 1.60% from other races, and 1.00% from two or more races. Hispanic or Latino of any race were 4.41% of the population.

There were 191 households, out of which 31.9% had children under the age of 18 living with them, 61.3% were married couples living together, 8.4% had a female householder with no husband present, and 26.7% were non-families. 22.5% of all households were made up of individuals, and 6.3% had someone living alone who was 65 years of age or older. The average household size was 2.57 and the average family size was 2.99.

In the village, the population was spread out, with 24.0% under the age of 18, 11.0% from 18 to 24, 28.5% from 25 to 44, 27.9% from 45 to 64, and 8.6% who were 65 years of age or older. The median age was 37 years. For every 100 females, there were 87.6 males. For every 100 females age 18 and over, there were 87.6 males.

The median income for a household in the village was $39,485, and the median income for a family was $42,500. Males had a median income of $33,750 versus $24,821 for females. The per capita income for the village was $19,650. About 3.3% of families and 6.2% of the population were below the poverty line, including 3.2% of those under age 18 and 5.5% of those age 65 or over.

References

External links
 Richmond Progress Community Progress Site for Richmond, LA

Villages in Louisiana
Villages in Madison Parish, Louisiana